Elusa cyathicornis is a species of moth of the family Noctuidae. It was described by Francis Walker in 1862 and is known from Borneo.

References

Moths described in 1862
Hadeninae
Moths of Borneo